Palpita arsaltealis is a moth of the family Crambidae first described by Francis Walker in 1859. It is found in the north-eastern United States, south to South Carolina. It is also present in Quebec and Ontario.

The wingspan is about 16 mm. Adults are on wing from spring to late summer.

External links

Line, Larry "Palpita arsaltealis". Moths of Maryland. Retrieved June 3, 2018.

Moths described in 1859
Palpita
Moths of North America